White Sulphur Springs may refer to:

White Sulphur Springs, Florida, a former name or the natural spring of White Springs, Florida
White Sulphur Springs, Hall County, Georgia, an unincorporated community
White Sulphur Springs, Meriwether County, Georgia, an unincorporated community
White Sulphur Springs (Jena, Louisiana), listed on the NRHP in La Salle Parish
White Sulphur Springs, Indiana
White Sulphur Springs, Montana
White Sulphur Springs, New York
White Sulphur Springs, North Carolina
White Sulphur Springs, West Virginia
White Sulphur Springs (Amtrak station)

See also
Sulphur spring